An Sae-Bom (Hangul: 안새봄; born 13 February 1990) is a South Korean taekwondo practitioner. She received a silver medal at the 2011 World Taekwondo Olympic Qualification Tournament for the 2012 Summer Olympics. She retired after her final interview for police officers with martial arts skills in 2019. In 2020,She received disciplinary action by the Korea Taekwondo Association for making a fuss in a restaurant nearby the jincheon athlete village while drunk.

References 

South Korean female taekwondo practitioners
1990 births
Living people
Universiade medalists in taekwondo
Universiade gold medalists for South Korea
World Taekwondo Championships medalists
Asian Taekwondo Championships medalists
Medalists at the 2017 Summer Universiade
21st-century South Korean women